David McCarthy (born 1994) is an Irish hurler who plays as a goalkeeper for club side Glenroe and at inter-county level with the Limerick senior hurling team.

Career

McCarthy first came to prominence at juvenile and underage levels with the Glenroe club before joining the club's adult team. He lined out in goal when the club beat Newcastle West to win the Limerick IHC title in 2019. McCarthy first appeared on the inter-county scene with the Limerick under-21 hurling team that won the All-Ireland Under-21 Championship title in 2015. He ended the season by being named on the Team of the Year. McCarthy's performances in this grade saw him drafted onto the Limerick senior hurling team in 2016, however, he was released from the panel after the conclusion of the 2017 National League. McCarthy won a Fitzgibbon Cup title with the University of Limerick in 2018, before being recalled to the Limerick senior team in 2022.

Honours

University of Limerick
Fitzgibbon Cup: 2015
2018
Glenroe
 Limerick Intermediate Hurling Championship: 2019

Limerick
 Munster Hurling Cup: 2022
 All-Ireland Under-21 Hurling Championship: 2015
 Munster Under-21 Hurling Championship : 2015

References

1994 births
Living people
Glenroe hurlers
Limerick inter-county hurlers
Hurling goalkeepers